P. esculenta  may refer to:
 Platonia esculenta, a synonym for Platonia insignis, a tree species found in South America
 Psoralea esculenta, an herbaceous perennial plant species native to prairies and dry woodlands of central North America

See also
 List of Latin and Greek words commonly used in systematic names#E